Grodziec may refer to the following places in Poland:

Grodziec, Greater Poland Voivodeship (west-central Poland)
Grodziec, Lower Silesian Voivodeship (south-west Poland)
 Grodziec Castle
Grodziec, Pomeranian Voivodeship (north Poland)
Grodziec, Silesian Voivodeship (south Poland)
Grodziec, Masovian Voivodeship (east-central Poland)
Grodziec, Namysłów County in Opole Voivodeship (south-west Poland)
Grodziec, Gmina Niemodlin in Opole Voivodeship (south-west Poland)
Grodziec, Gmina Ozimek in Opole Voivodeship (south-west Poland)
 Grodziec Mały in Lower Silesian Voivodeship (south-west Poland)
 Gmina Grodziec, in west-central Poland